The National Women's Law Center (NWLC) is a United States non-profit organization founded by Marcia Greenberger in 1972 and based in Washington, D.C. The Center advocates for women's rights and LGBTQ rights through litigation and policy initiatives. It began when female administrative staff and law students at the Center for Law and Social Policy demanded that their pay be improved, that the center hire female lawyers, that they no longer be expected to serve coffee, and that the center create a women's program.

The NWLC houses and administers the Time's Up Legal Defense Fund, which provides legal and media support to individuals who have been subject to workplace sex discrimination, such as sexual harassment.

History 

The history of the Nation Women's Law Center originated with secretaries who were employed with the Center of Law and Social Policy (CLASP), wanting higher pay, an increase in women staff employment, the initiation of a women's organization, and to no longer feel responsible for serving the coffee in the morning. After the establishment of the National Women's Law Center (NWLC), the female organization they created entitled, the Women's Rights Project, found fault in a standard company policy. The issue was concerned with pregnant women being deprived access to disability coverage. The acknowledgment of this flawed procedure essentially aided the vote of the Pregnancy Discrimination Act. The center has been developing for over 40 years and continues to make contributions today.

Marcia Greenberger was hired in 1972 to start the program and Nancy Duff Campbell joined her in 1978. In 1981, the two decided to turn the program into the separate National Women's Law Center. Marcia Greenberger and Nancy Duff Campbell stepped down as co-presidents July 1, 2017, and NWLC named Fatima Goss Graves President and CEO to succeed them.

Campaigns
The organization focuses on child care and early learning, education and Title IX, health care and reproductive rights, courts and judges, LGBTQ equality, military, poverty and economic security, racial and ethnic justice, tax and budget, and workplace justice.

The National Women's Law Center filed an amicus curiae brief in the 1996 Supreme Court case United States v. Virginia, which concerned the male-only admission policy of the Virginia Military Institute.

The NWLC houses and administers the Time's Up Legal Defense Fund, which provides legal and media support to individuals who have been subject to workplace sex discrimination, such as sexual harassment. 

The Fund as of 2022 had taken up the case of a female rugby referee who reported sexual misconduct by a man to the United States Center for SafeSport, misconduct which the man did not dispute, only to have SafeSport then investigate and attempt to punish her (the victim) for sharing documents related to the case. Jennifer Mondino, the director of the TIME'S UP Legal Defense Fund, said that: "You would hope that [SafeSport] would be being really thoughtful and intentional about setting up their processes in a way that would help survivors. And this seems to me to be exactly the opposite of that."

Affiliations 
The organization receives financial support from a variety of institutions aligned on women's rights policies. This includes fellow advocacy groups, academic institutions, law firms, reproductive health organizations, and pharmaceutical companies. Notable donors are Bayer, Bill & Melinda Gates Foundation, Ford Foundation, Google, Heather Podesta, Merck, Open Society Foundations, Pharmaceutical Research and Manufacturers of America (PhRMA), Pfizer, Planned Parenthood, Roche, Rockefeller Foundation, Thomson Reuters, and Visa, among others.

References

Further reading
 "History of the National Women's Law Center". National Women's Law Center. N.p. 29 July 2010. Web. Accessed 21 May 2021.
 "OCR Resolves Five NWLC Title IX Complaints and Finds District-Wide Underrepresentation of Girls in Sports". National Women's Law Center. N.p. 23 August 2012. Web. Accessed 21 May 2021.

External links
 

1972 establishments in Washington, D.C.
Legal advocacy organizations in the United States
Liberal feminist organizations
Organizations established in 1972
Women's organizations based in the United States